Sphenomorphus sheai, Shea's forest skink, is a species of skink found in Vietnam.

References

sheai
Reptiles described in 2013
Reptiles of Vietnam